Kretowiny  (German Kranthau) is a village in the administrative district of Gmina Morąg, within Ostróda County, Warmian-Masurian Voivodeship, in northern Poland. The village has a population of 140.

Kretowiny includes the largest of four campsites around Lake Narie, a popular tourist attraction. There is also a pier extending into the lake.

References

Kretowiny